The 1982 Florida gubernatorial election was held on November 2, 1982. Incumbent Democratic Governor Bob Graham was re-elected, defeating Republican nominee Skip Bafalis with 64.70% of the vote.  Bafalis was the last Florida Republican gubernatorial nominee to have never won a gubernatorial general election.

Primary elections
Primary elections were held on September 7, 1982.

Democratic primary

Candidates
Bob Graham, incumbent Governor
 Wayne Mixson, incumbent Lieutenant Governor
Fred Kuhn
Bob Kunst, gay rights activist and perennial candidate

Results

Republican primary

Candidates
Louis A. (Skip) Bafalis, U.S. Representative for the 10th district
Leo Callahan, Ft. Lauderdale Police Chief
Vernon Davids, attorney

Results

General election

Candidates
Bob Graham, Democratic
Skip Bafalis, Republican

Results

References

Bibliography
 

1982
Florida
Gubernatorial
November 1982 events